Annum Ingressi was an apostolic epistle written by Leo XIII in 1902. It was addressed to the bishops of the world reviewing the twenty five years of his pontificate. It also urged resistance to Freemasonry.

See also  
 Papal Documents relating to Freemasonry
 Anti-Masonry
 Christianity and Freemasonry
 Catholicism and Freemasonry
 Clarification concerning status of Catholics becoming Freemasons

References 

1902 in Christianity
Catholicism and Freemasonry
Apostolic letters of Pope Leo XIII